The Spring Creek Reservoir is the artificial lake created by the construction of the Spring Creek Dam across Spring Creek in the Shasta-Trinity National Forest of Shasta County, California, adjacent to Keswick.

The reservoir is used mostly for flood control storage, and is rarely filled to its  capacity. During the dry season, water from Spring Creek pools in a small pond retained behind the dam. Prior to the Iron Mountain Treatment Plant, the water in the reservoir was contaminated acidic mine waste in the reservoir space, and the water was acidic. When flows from the Shasta Dam, upstream on the Sacramento River, were sufficient to flush contaminated water away, water held in the reservoir was released through the outlet works into the Keswick Reservoir and the Sacramento River. Despite this operation strategy, the reservoir was eventually deemed inadequate for the watershed, and can be filled to capacity by a single heavy storm event. Uncontrollable spills frequently poured into the Sacramento River during floods, through the crest spillway of the dam, which lacks gates. As a result, numerous fish kills have occurred during these sudden releases of contaminants, a major one of which was in 1969. At this time, the water is neither contaminated with mine waste or acidic.

See also
 List of dams and reservoirs in California
 List of lakes in California

References

External links
 

Reservoirs in Shasta County, California
Shasta-Trinity National Forest
Reservoirs in California
Reservoirs in Northern California